Matías Nicolás Masiero Balas (born 15 January 1988, in Montevideo) is an Uruguayan footballer currently playing for Villa Teresa.

Club careers
In 2006, he began his career at first division club Central Español. He following year he was sold to Italian club Genoa but shortly after he was loaned to play in Serie B with Pisa. In 2009, he returned to Uruguay and joined C.A. Bella Vista.

Masiero moved to Chinese Super League side Hangzhou Greentown on a one-year loan deal in January 2011.

Notes

References

External links
Profile at tenfieldigital 
 

1988 births
Living people
Footballers from Montevideo
Uruguayan footballers
Uruguayan expatriate footballers
Central Español players
C.A. Bella Vista players
Unión Española footballers
Pisa S.C. players
Genoa C.F.C. players
Zhejiang Professional F.C. players
Unión La Calera footballers
El Tanque Sisley players
C.A. Cerro players
Cerro Largo F.C. players
Deportivo Maldonado players
Villa Teresa players
Serie A players
Serie B players
Chinese Super League players
Uruguayan Primera División players
Uruguayan Segunda División players
Expatriate footballers in Chile
Expatriate footballers in Italy
Association football midfielders
Expatriate footballers in China
Uruguayan expatriate sportspeople in China